The World Is Not Enough is a 1999 spy film, the nineteenth in the James Bond series produced by Eon Productions and the third to star Pierce Brosnan as the fictional MI6 agent James Bond. It was directed by Michael Apted, from an original story and screenplay by Neal Purvis, Robert Wade and Bruce Feirstein. It was produced by Michael G. Wilson and Barbara Broccoli. The title is the translation of the motto on the Bond family coat of arms, seen first in On Her Majesty's Secret Service.

The film's plot revolves around the assassination of billionaire Sir Robert King by the terrorist Renard, and Bond's subsequent assignment to protect King's daughter Elektra, who was previously held for ransom by Renard. During his assignment, Bond unravels a scheme to increase petroleum prices by triggering a nuclear meltdown in the waters of Istanbul.

Filming locations included Spain, France, Azerbaijan, Turkey, and the UK, with interiors shot at Pinewood Studios. The film received mixed reviews, with the plot and Denise Richards' casting frequently targeted for criticism; it also received praise for the performances of Brosnan and Sophie Marceau, and for its emotional weight and focus on characters in comparison to previous entries. The World Is Not Enough earned $361.8 million worldwide. It was also the first Eon-produced Bond film officially released under the Metro-Goldwyn-Mayer label instead of United Artists, the franchise's original owner and distributor.

Plot

In Bilbao, MI6 agent James Bond meets a Swiss banker named Lachaise to retrieve money for Sir Robert King, a British oil tycoon and friend of M. Bond interrogates the banker to identify the assassin of an MI6 agent, but Lachaise is killed before revealing this information, and Bond is forced to escape with the money. At MI6 headquarters in London, the money is revealed to be laced with explosives that kill King. Bond chases the assassin by boat on the Thames to the Millennium Dome, where she attempts to escape via hot air balloon. Bond offers her protection; she refuses and blows up the balloon at the cost of her life.

Bond traces the recovered money to Renard, a KGB agent turned terrorist. Following an earlier attempt on his life by MI6, Renard was left with a bullet embedded in his brain, which makes him immune to pain but will eventually kill him. M assigns Bond to protect King's daughter Elektra, whom Renard had previously abducted and held for ransom. Bond flies to Azerbaijan, where Elektra is overseeing the construction of an oil pipeline. During a tour of the pipeline's proposed route in the mountains, Bond and Elektra are attacked by a hit squad in armed, paraglider-equipped snowmobiles.

Bond visits Valentin Zukovsky at a casino to acquire information about Elektra's attackers. There, Bond grows suspicious as Elektra immediately loses $1 million on a game of high card draw, and discovers that Elektra's head of security, Sasha Davidov, is secretly in league with Renard. Bond kills Davidov and boards a plane bound for a Russian ICBM base in Kazakhstan. Posing as a Russian nuclear scientist, Bond meets American nuclear physicist Dr. Christmas Jones. Renard removes the GPS locator card and weapons-grade plutonium from a nuclear bomb. Before Bond can kill him, Jones blows his cover. Renard steals the bomb and flees, leaving everyone to die. Bond and Jones escape the exploding silo with the locator card.

In Azerbaijan, Bond warns M that Elektra may not be as innocent as she appears, and may have succumbed to Stockholm Syndrome under Renard's capture. 
He hands her the locator card as proof of the theft. An alarm sounds, revealing that the stolen bomb from Kazakhstan is attached to a pipeline inspection pig heading towards the oil terminal. Bond and Jones enter the pipeline to deactivate the bomb, and Jones discovers that half of the plutonium is missing. They jump clear of the rig and a large section of the pipe is destroyed. Bond and Jones are presumed killed. Back at the command centre, Elektra reveals that she killed her father as revenge for using her as bait for Renard. She abducts M, whom she resents for having advised her father not to pay the ransom money.

Bond accosts Zukovsky at his caviar factory in the Caspian Sea and they are attacked by Elektra's helicopters. Zukovsky reveals his arrangement with Elektra was to accept a payoff via bets in his casino in exchange for the use of a submarine captained by Zukovsky's nephew, Nikolai. The group goes to Istanbul, where Jones realizes that if Renard were to insert the stolen plutonium into the submarine's nuclear reactor, the resulting nuclear meltdown would destroy Istanbul, sabotaging the Russians' oil pipeline in the Bosphorus. Elektra's pipeline, planned to go around Istanbul, would dramatically increase in value. Bond gets a signal from the locator card at the Maiden's Tower before Zukovsky's henchman Bull blows up the command centre. Zukovsky is knocked unconscious, and Bond and Jones are captured by Elektra's henchmen. Jones is taken aboard the submarine, which was seized by Renard's men. Bond is taken to the tower, where Elektra tortures him with a garrote and reveals that she cut off a portion of her ear to make her kidnapping look more believable. Zukovsky and his men seize the tower, but Zukovsky is shot by Elektra. Before dying, Zukovsky uses his cane gun to free Bond, who frees M and kills Elektra.

Bond dives after the submarine, boards it and frees Jones. The submarine's hull ruptures as it sinks into the Bosphorus. Bond fights Renard and impales him by firing the plutonium rod into his stomach. Bond and Jones escape from the submarine, leaving the flooded reactor to detonate underwater. Later, they share a romantic evening in Istanbul and end up in bed together while being monitored by MI6 satellites.

Cast
 Pierce Brosnan as James Bond, MI6 agent, codename 007.
 Sophie Marceau as Elektra King, an oil heiress who is seemingly being targeted by Renard, the world's most wanted terrorist. M gives Bond the task of protecting her at all costs, although he suspects that there is more to her than meets the eye. Sharon Stone and Vera Farmiga were also considered for the role before Broccoli saw Marceau's performance in Firelight.
 Robert Carlyle as Victor "Renard" Zokas, a former KGB agent turned high-tech terrorist who previously kidnapped Elektra.  After a failed assassination attempt he has a bullet lodged in his brain, rendering him impervious to pain as well as slowly killing off his other senses, and ultimately killing him as well.  Before the casting of Carlyle the role was offered to Javier Bardem (who would later portray the Bond villain in Skyfall) and Jean Reno.
 Denise Richards as Dr. Christmas Jones, an American nuclear physicist assisting Bond in his mission. Richards stated that she liked the role because it was "brainy", "athletic", and had "depth of character, in contrast to Bond girls from previous decades". Richards stated that a lot of viewers "made fun of" the character's attire but that "these Bond girls are so outrageous and if I did really look like a scientist, the Bond fans would have been disappointed." Jones was originally written as a French-Polynesian insurance investigator before but the studio insisted on changing her nationality after the casting of Marceau. Tiffani Thiessen also auditioned.
 Robbie Coltrane as Valentin Zukovsky: A former Russian mafia boss and Baku casino owner. Bond initially seeks out Zukovsky for intel on Renard and is subsequently aided by him when Zukovsky's nephew falls into Renard's captivity. Coltrane reprises his role from GoldenEye.
 Desmond Llewelyn as Q: MI6's "quartermaster" who supplies Bond with multi-purpose vehicles and gadgets useful for the latter's mission. The film would be Llewelyn's final performance as Q. Although the actor was not officially retiring from the role, the Q character was training his eventual replacement in this film. Llewelyn was killed in a car accident shortly after the film's premiere.
 Maria Grazia Cucinotta as "Cigar Girl": An experienced assassin working for Renard, who appears as a lady who supplies Bond and the banker with cigars during their meeting in Bilbao and who tries to assassinate Bond in London. In the novelisation, the character is given the name Giulietta da Vinci.
 Samantha Bond as Miss Moneypenny: M's secretary.
 Michael Kitchen as Bill Tanner: M's Chief of Staff.
 Colin Salmon as Charles Robinson: M's Deputy Chief of Staff.
 Serena Scott Thomas as Dr. Molly Warmflash, an MI6 agent and doctor assigned to examine Bond, as well as describing Renard's seeming invincibility due to the terminal bullet in his brain that will kill him when it reaches the center of his brain.
 Ulrich Thomsen as Sasha Davidov: Elektra King's head of security in Azerbaijan and Renard's secret liaison.
 Goldie as Bull: Valentin Zukovsky's gold-toothed and gold-haired bodyguard, secretly working for Elektra and Renard. Although listed as 'Bull' in the credits, Zukovsky refers to him as 'Bullion' in the film.
 John Seru as Gabor: Elektra King's bodyguard who is seen accompanying King wherever she travels.
 Claude-Oliver Rudolph as Colonel Akakievich: The leader of the Russian ICBM base in Kazakhstan.
 Judi Dench as M: The head of MI6.
 Patrick Malahide portrays Lachaise, the Swiss banker killed early on in the film.
 Gary Powell as Submarine Crewman (uncredited)

 John Cleese as R: Q's assistant and appointed successor. Bond humorously refers to him as "R": "If you're Q, does that make him R?"

Production

Development

In November 1997, a month prior to the release of Tomorrow Never Dies, Barbara Broccoli watched a news report on Nightline detailing how the world's major oil companies were vying for control of the untapped oil reserves in the Caspian Sea in the wake of the Soviet Union's collapse, and suggested that controlling the only pipeline from the Caspian to the West would be an appropriate motivation for a potential Bond villain. She and Michael G. Wilson hired screenwriters Neal Purvis and Robert Wade to work on the film following their work on Plunkett & Macleane; Purvis and Wade would eventually write or co-write all of the following Bond films up to No Time to Die. The screenwriters retake a lot of the stuff from the aborted story Reunion with death, an eventual installment planned in 1993 for Timothy Dalton as Bond. Broccoli was especially impressed by the writers' suggestion of a female main villain, stating that "With Elektra, Bond thinks he has found Tracy, but he's really found Blofeld".

Joe Dante, and later Peter Jackson, were initially offered the opportunity to direct the film. Barbara Broccoli enjoyed Jackson's Heavenly Creatures, and a screening of The Frighteners was arranged for her. She disliked the latter film, however, and showed no further interest in Jackson. Jackson, a lifelong Bond fan, remarked that as Eon tended to go for less famous directors, he would likely not get another chance to direct a Bond film after The Lord of the Rings. Barbara Broccoli also was in talks with Alfonso Cuarón to direct, who nearly accepted. Hoping to find a director capable of eliciting strong performances from women, the producers eventually hired Michael Apted, as his work with Sissy Spacek in Coal Miner's Daughter, Sigourney Weaver in Gorillas in the Mist and Jodie Foster in Nell has earned all three actresses Oscar nominations (with Spacek winning). Apted's then-wife Dana Stevens did an uncredited rewrite, primarily to strengthen the female characters' roles, before Bruce Feirstein, who had worked in the previous two films, was hired to work on Bond's role.

Initially the film was to be released in 2000, rumoured to be titled Bond 2000. Other rumoured titles included Death Waits for No Man, Fire and Ice, Pressure Point and Dangerously Yours. The eventual title The World Is Not Enough is an English translation of the Latin phrase Orbis non sufficit, the motto of Bond's supposed real-world ancestor Sir Thomas Bond. In the novel On Her Majesty's Secret Service and its film adaptation, it is first claimed to be James Bond's family motto as well.

The phrase Orbis non sufficit is thought to originate from the Pharsalia by Lucan. It appears twice, both with uncomplimentary associations: the first reference is to a group of villainous mutineers, and the second is to the ambitious Julius Caesar. It was then applied to Alexander the Great by Juvenal in his collection of satirical poems, the  Satires: "The world was not big enough for Alexander the Great, but a coffin was". Phrased as Non sufficit orbis, it became the motto of the Spanish king Philip II after ascending the Portuguese throne in 1580.

Filming

The pre-title sequence begins in Bilbao, Spain, featuring the Guggenheim Museum. After the opening scene, the film moves to London, showcasing the SIS Building and the Millennium Dome on the Thames. The sequence lasts for about 14 minutes, making it the longest pre-title sequence in the series until No Time to Die in 2021. The Daily Telegraph claimed that the British Government prevented some filming in front of the actual MI6 Headquarters at Vauxhall Cross, citing a security risk. However, a Foreign Office spokesperson rejected the claims and expressed displeasure with the article. Following the title sequence, Eilean Donan Castle in Scotland is used by MI6 as a location headquarters. Other locations include Baku, Azerbaijan, the Azerbaijan Oil Rocks and Istanbul, Turkey, where Maiden's Tower and Küçüksu Palace are shown.

Principal photography began on 17 January 1999, and lasted until June of that year. The studio work for the film was shot as usual in Pinewood Studios, including Albert R. Broccoli's 007 Stage. Bilbao, Spain was used briefly for the exterior of the Swiss bank and flyover-bridge adjacent to the Guggenheim Museum. In London outdoor footage was shot of the SIS Building and Vauxhall Cross with several weeks filming the boat chase on the River Thames eastwards towards the Millennium Dome, Greenwich. The canal footage of the chase where Bond soaks the parking wardens was filmed at Wapping and the boat stunts in Millwall Dock and under Glengall Bridge were filmed at the Isle of Dogs. Chatham Dockyard was also used for part of the boat chase. Stowe School, Buckinghamshire, was used as the site of the King family estate on the banks of Loch Lomond. Filming continued in Scotland at Eilean Donan Castle which was used to depict the exterior of MI6 temporary operations centre "Castle Thane". The skiing chase sequence in the Caucasus was shot on the slopes of Chamonix, France. Filming of the scene was delayed by an avalanche; the crew helped in the rescue operation.

The interior (and single exterior shot) of L'Or Noir casino in Baku, Azerbaijan, was shot at Halton House, the officers' mess of RAF Halton. RAF Northolt was used to depict the airfield runway in Azerbaijan.
Zukovsky's quayside caviar factory was shot entirely at the outdoor water tank at Pinewood. The exterior of Kazakhstan nuclear facility was shot at the Bardenas Reales, in Navarre, Spain, and the exterior of the oil refinery control centre at the Motorola building in Groundwell, Swindon. The exterior of the oil pipeline was filmed in Cwm Dyli, Snowdonia, Wales, while the production teams shot the oil pipeline explosion on Hankley Common, Elstead, Surrey. Istanbul, Turkey, was used in the film, also using the famous Maiden's Tower which was used as Renard's hideout in Turkey. Exteriors for Elektra King's Baku villa were shot at Küçüksu Pavilion in Istanbul, and interiors were shot at Luton Hoo in Bedfordshire, England. The underwater submarine scenes were filmed in the Bahamas.

The BMW Z8 driven by Bond in the film was the final part of a three-film product placement deal with BMW (which began with the Z3 in GoldenEye and continued with the 750iL in Tomorrow Never Dies) but, due to filming preceding release of the Z8 by a few months, several working mock-ups and models were manufactured for filming purposes.

Music

The soundtrack to The World Is Not Enough is the second Bond soundtrack to be composed by David Arnold. Arnold broke tradition by not ending the film with a reprise of the opening theme or, as with the previous three films, a new song. Originally, Arnold intended to use the song "Only Myself to Blame" at the end of the film; however, Apted discarded this and the song was replaced by a remix of the "James Bond Theme". "Only Myself to Blame", written by Arnold and Don Black and sung by Scott Walker, is the 19th and final track on the album and its melody is Elektra King's theme. The theme is heard in "Casino", "Elektra's Theme" and "I Never Miss". Arnold added two new themes to the final score, both of which are reused in the following film, Die Another Day.

The title song, "The World Is Not Enough", was written by David Arnold with Don Black and performed by Garbage. It is the fifth Bond theme co-written by Black, preceded by "Thunderball", "Diamonds Are Forever", "The Man with the Golden Gun", and "Tomorrow Never Dies". IGN chose "The World Is Not Enough" as the ninth-best James Bond theme of all time. In 2012 Grantland ranked the song as the second-best Bond song of all-time, behind only "Goldfinger." The song also appeared in two "best of 1999" polls: #87 in 89X's "Top 89 Songs of 1999" and No. 100 in Q101's "Top 101 of 1999".

Another theme song was made by English post-Britpop band Straw (band), which was also titled The World Is Not Enough but was rejected in favor of Garbage's song. The song is unique as the lyrics contains references to several of the Ian Fleming novels, including references to Goldfinger, You Only Live Twice, On Her Majesty's Secret Service, and Live and Let Die.

Release and reception
The World Is Not Enough premiered on 19 November 1999 in the United States and on 26 November 1999 in the United Kingdom. Its world premiere was 8 November 1999 at the Fox Bruin Theater, Los Angeles, USA. At that time MGM signed a marketing partnership with MTV, primarily for American youths, who were assumed to have considered Bond as "an old-fashioned secret service agent". As a result, MTV broadcast more than 100 hours of Bond-related programmes immediately after the film was released, most being presented by Denise Richards.

Box office
The film opened at the top of the North American box office with $35.5 million earned during its opening weekend. For five days, it remained in that spot until it was handed to Toy Story 2. Its final worldwide gross was $361.8 million worldwide, with $126 million in the United States alone. It became the highest grossing James Bond film of all time until the release of Die Another Day. The film was also selected for the first round of nominations for the Academy Award for Best Visual Effects and it was failing to get nominated. The film was nominated for a Best Action/Adventure/Thriller Film Saturn Award, Pierce Brosnan won both the Empire Award and the Blockbuster Entertainment Award as Best Actor, and David Arnold won a BMI Film Music Award for his score. The film became the first in the Bond series to win a Golden Raspberry when Denise Richards was chosen as "Worst Supporting Actress" at the 1999 Razzie Awards. Richards and Brosnan were also nominated for "Worst Screen Couple" (lost to Will Smith and Kevin Kline for Wild Wild West).
The initial release of the DVD includes the featurette "Secrets of 007", which cuts into "making of" material during the film; the documentary "The Making of The World Is Not Enough"; two commentary tracks—one by director Michael Apted, and the other by production designer Peter Lamont, second unit director Vic Armstrong, and composer David Arnold; a trailer for the PlayStation video game, and the Garbage music video. The Ultimate Edition released in 2006 had as additional extras a 2000 documentary named "Bond Cocktail", a featurette on shooting the Q Boat scenes, Pierce Brosnan in a press conference in Hong Kong, deleted scenes, and a tribute to Desmond Llewelyn.

Critical reception

Reception was mixed. Chicago Sun-Times critic Roger Ebert said the film was a "splendid comic thriller, exciting and graceful, endlessly inventive", and gave it three-and-a-half stars out of four. On the other hand, Eleanor Ringel Gillespie of The Atlanta Journal-Constitution disliked the film, calling it "dated and confused". Rotten Tomatoes gave The World Is Not Enough  rating, the lowest of the Brosnan Bond films. The site's consensus states: "Plagued by mediocre writing, uneven acting, and a fairly by-the-numbers plot, The World Is Not Enough is partially saved by some entertaining and truly Bond-worthy action sequences." Metacritic gives the film a score of 59 out of 100. Nathan Rabin from The A.V. Club opined that "enough fun moments are scattered throughout to make it a decent Bond entry. But the series still needs a massive shot of fresh ideas if it wishes to become anything more than a nostalgia-fueled commercial sure thing". Antonia Quirke from The Independent said that the film "is certainly less definitively feeble than other recent Bond offerings, with an at least two-dimensional female character in the bold and oval Marceau. But my reaction is much the same as to a new Rolling Stones album: I'm just grateful that it's not embarrassing". Negative criticism was focused on the execution of the plot, and the action scenes were considered excessive.

Richards was widely criticized for not being credible in the role of a nuclear scientist, with Variety calling her "the least plausible nuclear physicist in the history of movies, who makes even the electrochemist Elisabeth Shue played in 1997's The Saint sound like a Nobel laureate"; Nathan Rabin panned her performance and called it "so laughably awful that the film comes to a dead stop whenever she's on screen". She was ranked as one of the worst Bond girls of all time by Entertainment Weekly in 2008.

In contrast, Sophie Marceau was praised for her role as Elektra, with most critics agreeing that she was a better Bond Girl than Denise Richards' Christmas Jones and a better Bond villain than Robert Carlyle's Renard. Peter Bradshaw from The Guardian called her "terrific: sexy, stylish, with a really beautiful face entirely innocent of the cosmetic surgeon's art".

Retrospective 
Pete Debruge of Variety wrote in 2012 that "[The World Is Not Enough] presents a conflicted persona torn between the corny antics of the Roger Moore era and the grim seriousness of where things would eventually go under Daniel Craig’s tenure. It also contains a dose of Timothy Dalton-esque toughness [...] Much of what made Brosnan such a great Bond is thrust into the backseat by lame jokes and a premature attempt to mix up the formula", concluding that it was "nothing but a reversion to the franchise's most adolescent tendencies". Entertainment Weekly picked it as the worst Bond film of all time in 2006, saying it had a plot "so convoluted even Pierce Brosnan has admitted to being mystified". Norman Wilner of MSN chose it as the third worst film, above A View to a Kill and Licence to Kill, while IGN chose it as the fifth worst, both in 2007.

Adaptations

Bond novelist Raymond Benson wrote his adaptation of The World Is Not Enough from the film's screenplay. It was Benson's fourth Bond novel and followed the story closely, but with some details changed. For instance, Elektra sings quietly before her death and Bond still carries his Walther PPK instead of the newer P99. The novel also gave the cigar girl/assassin the name Giulietta da Vinci and retained a scene between her and Renard that was cut from the film.

In 2000, the film was adapted by Electronic Arts to create two first-person shooters of the same name for the Nintendo 64 and PlayStation. The Nintendo 64 version was developed by Eurocom and the PlayStation version was developed by Black Ops. Versions of The World Is Not Enough for the PC and the PlayStation 2 were planned for release in 2000, but both were cancelled. These versions would have used the id Tech 3 game engine from Quake III Arena. Although this game marks Pierce Brosnan's fifth appearance in a Bond video game, the game includes only his likeness; the character is voiced by Adam Blackwood.

See also

 Outline of James Bond

Notes

References

External links

 
 
 
 
 MGM's official The World is Not Enough website

 
1999 action thriller films
1990s adventure films
1990s spy films
1999 films
British sequel films
Films scored by David Arnold
Films about nuclear war and weapons
Films about terrorism
Films directed by Michael Apted
Films produced by Barbara Broccoli
Films produced by Michael G. Wilson
Films set in 1999
Films set in Baku
Films set in Istanbul
Films set in Kazakhstan
Films set in London
Films set in Scotland
Films set in Spain
Films shot in Azerbaijan
Films shot in Wales
Films shot in Istanbul
Films shot in Spain
James Bond films
Metro-Goldwyn-Mayer films
Patricide in fiction
Films shot at Pinewood Studios
Skiing films
Submarine films
Eon Productions films
Films with screenplays by Neal Purvis and Robert Wade
Films with screenplays by Bruce Feirstein
Films shot in Bedfordshire
Golden Raspberry Award winning films
1990s English-language films
1990s British films
Films shot in Bilbao
Films set in the Basque County